Hannah Drake is an American poet, blogger, activist, public speaker, and author of 11 books.

On Super Bowl Sunday of 2019 (Feb 3, 2019), Drake garnered a lot of attention when film director and producer Ava DuVernay tweeted out a video of Drake’s poem “All You Had to Do Was Play the Game, Boy.” DuVernay’s tweet was meant to protest the NFL’s treatment of former football quarterback and civil rights activist Colin Kaepernick. Kaepernick in turn shared the poem with his followers, and Drake’s video reached 2.4 million viewers.

In February 2019, Drake was selected by the Muhammad Ali Center to be a Daughter of Greatness. The Daughter of Greatness Breakfast Series features prominent women engaged in social philanthropy, activism, and pursuits of justice to share their stories with the Louisville community.

Drake is the chief creative officer of IDEAS xLab, an artist-run nonprofit based in Louisville, KY. In 2021, The New York Times recognized her work on the (Un)Known Project, a multimedia installation artwork meant to recognize all the Black people who were enslaved in Kentucky and elsewhere.

Recently, Drake was selected as one of the Best of the Best in Louisville, Kentucky for her poem “Spaces.”

Bibliography

Books

References

External links 

 Drake's personal website

21st-century American poets
African-American women writers
African-American poets
American women poets
Activists from Kentucky
Activists for African-American civil rights
21st-century American women writers
Writers from Louisville, Kentucky
Living people
Poets from Kentucky
Year of birth missing (living people)
African-American bloggers
American bloggers
American women bloggers